Yunzhou or Yun Prefecture was a zhou (prefecture) in imperial China seated in modern Datong, Shanxi, China. It existed (intermittently) from 640 to 1044.

It was one of the Sixteen Prefectures.

References
 

Former prefectures in Shanxi
Sixteen Prefectures
Prefectures of the Tang dynasty
Prefectures of Later Tang
Prefectures of the Liao dynasty
640 establishments
640s disestablishments
7th-century establishments in China
1040s disestablishments in Asia
11th-century disestablishments in China